Woman in the Moon is a studio album by American country artist Chely Wright. The album was released on August 9, 1994 on Polydor Records and was produced by both Barry Beckett and Harold Shedd. Woman in the Moon was Wright's debut album as a music artist and contained a total of ten tracks. The album spawned three singles and was the first of two albums Wright would release under the Polydor label.

Background and content
Woman in the Moon was recorded in Nashville, Tennessee, United States and consisted of ten tracks. Both Barry Beckett and Harold Shedd produced the album. Half of the album's tracks were either written or co-written by Wright. These tracks included "Till All Her Tears Are Dry", "Go On and Go", and "Sea of Cowboy Hats", which would later be released as a single. The album also included a cover of Bill Anderson's "Nobody But a Fool (Would Love You)", which was a top ten hit for Connie Smith in 1966. The seventh track "I Love You Enough to Let You Go" was co-written by country artist Keith Whitley. The album's second track "He's a Good Ole Boy" was composed by country music songwriter Harlan Howard, who had previously written songs for other well-known country artists.

Release and reception

Woman in the Moon was released on August 9, 1994 on PolyGram and Mercury Records. It was distributed as both a compact disc and a cassette. The project spawned three singles between 1994 and 1995. The album's lead single "He's a Good Ole Boy" was released in July 1994, peaking at number 58 on the Billboard Hot Country Singles & Tracks chart and number 55 on the Canadian RPM Country Tracks chart. The second single, "Till I Was Loved By You," was released in October 1994, peaking at number 48 on the country chart and number 66 on the RPM Country Tracks chart. The third single spawned was the track "Sea of Cowboy Hats", which was released in 1995. The song reached a peak of 56 on the American country chart and 74 on the Canadian country chart that year. 

Brett Milano of New Country rated the album 3  stars out of 5, saying that Wright "clearly loves a lyric with a meaty storyline" and "Wright also has a warmer romantic side, as...'Till I Was Loved by You' demonstrates, but most of these tracks suggest she's not a woman to be messed with." Milano's review also singled out "The Last Supper", noting that the subject of the song is "really planning to poison" her husband.

Track listing

Compact disc and digital versions

Cassette version

Personnel
All credits for Woman in the Moon are adapted from Allmusic.

Musical personnel
 Eddie Bayers – drums, percussion
 Barry Beckett – keyboards
 Glen Duncan – fiddle
 Rob Hajacos – fiddle
 Owen Hale – drums
 Terry McMillan – harmonica
 Weldon Myrick – steel guitar
 Don Potter – acoustic guitar
 Brent Rowan – mandolin, electric guitar
 John Wesley Ryles – background vocals
 Harry Stinson – background vocals
 Cindy Richardson Walker – background vocals
 Dennis Wilson – background vocals
 Bob Wray – bass guitar
 Chely Wright – background vocals, lead vocals
 Curtis Young – background vocals

Technical personnel
 Terry Bates – assistant engineer
 Barry Beckett – producer
 Jim Burnett – mixing assistant 
 Don Cobb – digital editing
 Mary Beth Felts – hairstylist and makeup
 Pete Greene – engineer
 Cynthia Grimson – executive art direction
 David Hall – assistant engineer
 Amy Hughes – assistant engineer
 Ron Keith – photography
 Patrick Kelly – assistant engineer
 Diane Painter – art direction and design
 Denny Purcell – mastering
 Ed Seay – mixing
 Harold Shedd – producer

Release history

References 

1994 debut albums
Albums produced by Barry Beckett
Albums produced by Harold Shedd
Chely Wright albums
Mercury Records albums
PolyGram albums